Phyllonorycter kautziella is a moth of the family Gracillariidae. It is known from all of Spain.

References

kautziella
Moths of Europe
Moths described in 1938